Oroles was a Dacian king during the first half of the 2nd century BC.

He successfully opposed the Bastarnae, blocking their invasion into Transylvania.
The Roman historian Trogus Pompeius wrote about king Oroles punishing his soldiers into sleeping at their wives' feet and doing the household chores, because of their initial failure in defeating the invaders. Subsequently, the now "highly motivated" Dacian army defeated the Bastarnae and king Oroles lifted all sanctions.

References

Dicţionar de istorie veche a României ("Dictionary of ancient Romanian history") (1976) Editura Ştiinţifică şi Enciclopedică

Dacian kings
2nd-century BC rulers in Europe